Steven William Paterson (born 8 April 1958) is a Scottish football manager and former player.

Nicknamed "Pele", after six first team games for Manchester United, his career was curtailed due an injury in a pre-season game after transferring to Sheffield United. Despite this and problems as well as a long-term gambling and alcohol addiction, he did have a footballing career with spells in Hong Kong, Australia and Japan where in 1983 he was the first overseas player to play there.

Paterson has had more success as a manager, winning several competitions in the Highland League with several clubs and his very fruitful 7-year spell at Inverness Caledonian Thistle leading them from the Scottish Third Division to the Scottish First Division and a famous cup upset over Celtic.

He has also published an autobiography "Confessions of a Highland Hero" ghost-written by Frank Gilfeather which documents his career and battles with gambling and alcohol addictions which were brought to media attention during his ill-fated spell at Aberdeen.

In addition to his football career, Paterson is also a qualified social worker.

Playing career
During his professional playing career, Paterson played as a central defender and joined Manchester United from Highland League club Nairn County in July 1975. He made a total of six league appearances for the Red Devils over five seasons. He signed for Sheffield United in a £60,000 deal but an ankle injury sustained in pre-season training forced Paterson to retire.

Paterson made his comeback as a player in July 1981 with Highland League club Buckie Thistle. He turned down Dundee United to join Peterhead. He had a spell playing for Hong Kong Rangers before again returning to his roots with Highland League club Nairn County in August 1982. The following February, he rejoined former boss Tommy Docherty at Sydney Olympic and then moved on to become the first European to play in Japan in December 1983. He won cups and titles with Yomiuri before his playing career was again cut short by persistent injury problems.

Paterson was a Scotland youth internationalist. He debuted for the under-18s against England at Old Trafford at 15 years old.

Managerial career

Elgin City
His management career began in 1988 in the Highland League with Elgin City. Primarily a player-manager in his first season, Paterson had a successful stint at Borough Briggs winning the Highland League, the North of Scotland Cup twice and the Northern version of the Scottish Qualifying Cup. He left the club in 1990 due to a contract disagreement with regards to wages.

Huntly
He immediately moved on to Highland League rivals Huntly and his managerial success continued over the next five years. He won the Highland League twice and a host of other silverware including the Aberdeenshire Cup, the Northern version of the Scottish Qualifying Cup and the Highland League Cup. He also masterminded a Scottish Cup upset at Scottish Third Division club Dumbarton.

Inverness Caledonian Thistle
In the summer of 1995 he joined Inverness Caledonian Thistle, who were playing in the Scottish Third Division at that time. Paterson spent seven and a half years at Caley Thistle, their longest-serving manager to date. During this time, he took the club from the Third Division to the First Division and presided over the team's famous victories against Celtic (resulting in the well-known newspaper headline "Super Caley Go Ballistic, Celtic Are Atrocious") and Hearts in the Scottish Cup.

In November 2002, Paterson was strongly linked with the vacant manager's job at Dundee United, but he stayed at Caley Thistle for another month.

Aberdeen
He was offered the manager's position at Aberdeen and became the club's new boss on 11 December 2002. This move was not without controversy, as Paterson and his assistant Duncan Shearer were each supposed to have agreed a five-year contract with Caley Thistle not long before their departure to the Dons.

Paterson's tenure with Aberdeen was marred by his abuse of alcohol. In March 2003 he failed to attend a home game against Dundee due to being too hungover, after binge drinking the night before the match.

Paterson and Shearer left Aberdeen in the summer of 2004, after a campaign in which the club came dangerously close to being relegated. He did however win a couple of Aberdeenshire Cup titles during his tenure.

Forres Mechanics
In the same year he returned to the Highland League with Forres Mechanics where they returned to successful ways winning both the North of Scotland Cup and Inverness Cup.

Peterhead
On 30 October 2006, he returned to the Scottish Football League when he was announced as the new manager of Peterhead, a position from which he was eventually dismissed on 10 January 2008.

Return to Huntly

In 2010, he returned to the Highland League with a second spell at Christie Park but his return was brief and not as successful as his first.

Formartine United
In March 2011, Paterson left his post at Huntly to take up the managers post at Formartine United. He added to his trophy haul with success in the Aberdeenshire Cup in 2014.

Paterson left Formartine United in summer 2015.

Dufftown

On 9 December 2015, it was announced that Paterson had agreed to become manager of North Region junior side Dufftown.

Personal life
In March 2003, Paterson revealed he had an alcohol problem, after missing Aberdeen's 3–3 home draw with Dundee due to being too hungover to attend. In October 2008 it was reported that Paterson had lost £1 million from betting. Paterson's biography "Confessions of a Highland Hero" co-written with former Grampian Television presenter Frank Gilfeather was published in November 2009, and was serialised in the Daily Record.

Managerial statistics

Scottish Football League statistics only.

Honours

Player

Yomiuri
 Japan Soccer League: 1984
 Emperor's Cup: 1984
 Xerox Super Cup: 1984

Manager

Elgin City
 Highland League: 1989–90
 Qualifying Cup North: 1989–90
 North of Scotland Cup: 1989–90

Huntly
 Highland League: 1993–94, 1994–95
 Highland League Cup: 1992–93, 1993–94
 Aberdeenshire Cup: 1993–94, 1994–95
 Qualifying Cup North: 1992–93, 1994–95

Inverness CT
 Scottish Second Division: Promoted 1998–99
 Scottish Third Division: 1996–97

Formartine United
 Aberdeenshire Cup: 2013–14

Individual
 SFL Third Division Manager of the Year: 1996–97

References

External links
Who is Steve Paterson?

1958 births
Living people
People from Elgin, Moray
Scottish footballers
Scottish expatriate footballers
Scottish football managers
Manchester United F.C. players
Sheffield United F.C. players
Elgin City F.C. players
Scottish expatriate sportspeople in Hong Kong
Elgin City F.C. managers
Inverness Caledonian Thistle F.C. managers
Aberdeen F.C. managers
Peterhead F.C. managers
Expatriate footballers in Japan
Japan Soccer League players
Scottish Premier League managers
Expatriate footballers in Hong Kong
Buckie Thistle F.C. players
Forres Mechanics F.C. players
Nairn County F.C. players
Scottish Football League managers
Highland Football League players
Association football defenders
Association football forwards
Scottish Junior Football Association managers
Sportspeople from Moray
Huntly F.C. managers
Forres Mechanics F.C. managers
Formartine United F.C. managers
Highland Football League managers